Imperfect Journey is a 1994 Ethiopian documentary film directed by Haile Gerima.

Plot summary 
Imperfect Journey is a BBC commissioned film, exploring the political and psychic recovery of the Ethiopian people after the atrocities and political repression or "red terror" of the military junta of Mengistu Haile Mariam.

Haile Gerima travelled to Ethiopia together with Ryszard Kapuściński. In the course of the journey they meet and talk with people from all levels of Ethiopian society. The filmmaker questions the direction of the succeeding government and the will of the people in creating institutions guaranteeing their liberation.

Haile Gerima gave his thoughts on the film

References

1994 films
Ethiopian documentary films
Amharic-language films
English-language Ethiopian films
Films set in Ethiopia
Films directed by Haile Gerima
Documentary films about African politics
1990s English-language films